The Tiadaghton Valley Regional Police Department (TVRPD) was a regional police department in Lycoming County, Pennsylvania. As of January 1, 2023, TVRPD merged with Old Lycoming Police Department to form the Lycoming Regional Police Department. The department served the residents of Jersey Shore borough as well as Cummings, McHenry, Nippenose, Piatt, and Porter townships.

History 
Tiadaghton Valley Regional Police Department was formed via the merger of Jersey Shore Borough Police Department and Porter Township Police Department in 2010.

Vehicles 
TVRPD operates an all-Ford fleet. They operate marked and unmarked Ford Interceptor sedans police version of the Taurus and Ford Interceptor Utility police version of the Explorer.

Fallen officers 
Officers featured in this section died from injuries after or while conducting law enforcement operations while on duty.

Note
a.This occurred well before regionalisation. Norton was member of the Jersey Shore Borough Police Department.

See also 

 List of law enforcement agencies in Pennsylvania

References 

Municipal police departments of Pennsylvania